A pyramidal peak, sometimes called a glacial horn in extreme cases, is an angular, sharply pointed mountain peak which results from the cirque erosion due to multiple glaciers diverging from a central point. Pyramidal peaks are often examples of nunataks.

Formation

Glaciers, typically forming in drainages on the sides of a mountain, develop bowl-shaped basins called cirques (sometimes called ‘corries’ - from Scottish Gaelic  [kʰəɾə] (a bowl) - or s). Cirque glaciers have rotational sliding that abrades the floor of the basin more than walls and that causes the bowl shape to form. As cirques are formed by glaciation in an alpine environment, the headwall and ridges between parallel glaciers called arêtes become more steep and defined. This occurs due to freeze/thaw and mass wasting beneath the ice surface. It is widely held that a common cause for headwall steepening and extension headward is the crevasses known as bergschrund that occur between the moving ice and the headwall. Plucking and shattering can be seen here by those exploring the crevasses. A cirque is exposed when the glacier that created it recedes.

When three or more of these cirques converge on a central point, they create a pyramid-shaped peak with steep walls. These horns are a common shape for mountain tops in highly glaciated areas. The number of faces of a horn depends on the number of cirques involved in the formation of the peak: three to four is most common. Horns with more than four faces include the Weissmies and the Mönch. A peak with four symmetrical faces is called a Matterhorn (after the Matterhorn, a mountain in the Alps).

The peak of a glacial horn will often outlast the arêtes on its flanks. As the rock around it erodes, the horn gains in prominence. Eventually, a glacial horn will have near vertical faces on all sides. In the Alps, "horn" is also the name of very exposed peaks with slope inclinations of 45-60° (e.g. Kitzbüheler Horn).

Examples

Alpamayo in Ancash, Peru
Artesonraju in Ancash, Peru
Belalakaya, Greater Caucasus, Russia
Crowsnest Mountain in Alberta, Canada
Cuillin in Skye, Scotland
Errigal in Donegal, Ireland
Fitz Roy in Patagonia, South America
Grand Teton in Grand Teton National Park, Wyoming, United States
K2 in China and Pakistan
Kamenitsa, Pirin Mountain, Bulgaria
Ketil in Greenland
Khan Tengri in Kazakhstan, Kyrgyzstan and China
Kinnerly Peak in Glacier National Park, Montana, United States
The Kitzsteinhorn in Salzburg, Austria
The Matterhorn in Italy and Switzerland
Momin Dvor, Pirin Mountain, Bulgaria
Mount Aspiring/Tititea in Otago, New Zealand
Mount Assiniboine in British Columbia, Canada
Mount Thielsen in Oregon, United States
Mount Wilbur in Glacier National Park, Montana, United States
Nevado Las Agujas in Los Ríos, Chile
Nevado Pirámide in Peru
Pilot Peak in Wyoming, United States
Puy Mary in Cantal, France
Pyramiden in Greenland
Reynolds Mountain in Glacier National Park, Montana, United States
Shivling in Uttarakhand, India
Stob Dearg in Glen Coe, Scotland
Store Skagastølstind in Sogn og Fjordane, Norway
The Horn in Victoria, Australia
The Pyramid in Antarctica
The Storr in Skye, Scotland
Snowdon in Snowdonia, Wales
Vihren, Pirin Mountain, Bulgaria

See also
Glacial landforms
Pyramid Peak (disambiguation)

References

Bibliography

External links 
 

Mountains
Glacial erosion landforms